The Lilac Road Bridge is a reinforced concrete arch bridge in Bonsall, California, built in 1978 at a cost of $1,500,000. It was designed by Fred G. Michaels and John Suwada, with architecture consulting by William Wells. This bridge is one of the two overcrossings in San Diego County with this unique arch design, the other being the Eastgate Mall Bridge. When traveling northbound on I-15 it is the noticeably high bridge before the SR 76 exit.

References 

1978 establishments in California
Bridges completed in 1978
Bridges in San Diego County, California
Concrete bridges in California
Interstate 15
Open-spandrel deck arch bridges in the United States
Road bridges in California